Aberdeen Channel is a channel between the east side of Ap Lei Chau (Aberdeen Island) and Nam Long Shan (Brick Hill) on Hong Kong Island in Hong Kong. With two bays, Po Chong Wan and Tai Shue Wan, major portions of the channel are transformed into Aberdeen South Typhoon Shelter. As the channel approaches the north end of Ap Lei Chau it becomes Aberdeen Bay.

External links

 Map of Aberdeen Channel, Hong Kong

Channels of Hong Kong
Ap Lei Chau